B.L. Harbert International, LLC, is a construction company based in Birmingham, Alabama, that was founded in 2000 by Billy L. Harbert, as a division of Harbert Corporation. B.L. Harbert has two main operating divisions, the U.S. Division and the International Division. The U.S. Division is further divided into the following divisions: commercial, healthcare, federal, and civil/industrial. They undertake the preconstruction, general construction, construction management, and design-build services of office buildings, condominiums, institutional buildings, healthcare facilities, churches, industrial facilities, water and wastewater treatment plants. 

BL Harbert employed over 8,000 people around the world as of 2021. Much of the firm's business is in the form of federal government contracts for embassy construction projects abroad, the largest of these in cumulative contract value being U.S. Embassy Beirut ($613.8 million), U.S. Embassy New Delhi ($563.5 million), U.S. Consulate Erbil ($433.2 million), and Guatemala City ($288.5 million). In 2019 the company was ranked the 90th largest contractor in the country by Engineering News-Record. They are also one of the top 100 contractors for the US government. 

The company has additional U.S. offices in: Atlanta, Charleston, Houston, Huntsville, Oxford, Nashville and Washington D.C. The company has international offices in: London, Dubai, and Istanbul.

Projects
The Sandy and John Black Pavilion at Ole Miss, Oxford, Mississippi
U.S. Embassy, Mbabane, Swaziland
Concord Center, Birmingham, Alabama
Auburn Basketball Arena, Auburn, Alabama
U.S. Consular Compound, Johannesburg, South Africa

References

External links
B.L. Harbert International Website

Companies based in Birmingham, Alabama
Harbert family